Lancelot Rupert Shilton AM (30 December 192112 March 1998) was an Australian Anglican cleric. He became the 8th Dean of Sydney on 30 November 1973, remaining in office until 1988.

Shilton was born in late 1921 in Elsternwick, Victoria, a suburb of Melbourne. He was educated at the  University of Melbourne and ordained in 1950. His first post was as a curate in Hawthorn. Then he was the incumbent at Carlton from 1951 to 1954. After this he was at the University of London for two years completing a Bachelor of Divinity degree. From 1957 to 1973, he was the rector of Holy Trinity, Adelaide.

In 1985, he was appointed a Member of the Order of Australia (AM). He died on 12 March 1998.

References

University of Melbourne alumni
Alumni of the University of London
Deans of Sydney
1921 births
1998 deaths
Members of the Order of Australia
Clergy from Melbourne
People from Elsternwick, Victoria